Poplar Plains is a census-designated place (CDP) in the town of Westport, Fairfield County, Connecticut, United States. It occupies the northwest corner of the town and is bordered to the southwest by the city of Norwalk, to the northwest by the town of Wilton, to the northeast by the town of Weston, to the east by the Saugatuck River, and to the south by the Merritt Parkway.

Poplar Plains was first listed as a CDP prior to the 2020 census.

References 

Census-designated places in Fairfield County, Connecticut
Census-designated places in Connecticut